Montescudaio is a comune (municipality) in the Province of Pisa in the Italian region Tuscany, located about  southwest of Florence and about  southeast of Pisa.

Twin towns
 Castril, Spain, since 2006 
 Eberstadt, Germany, since 1984
 Charlotte Amalie, U.S. Virgin Islands, since 2010
 Christiansted, U.S. Virgin Islands, since 2010
 Frederiksted, U.S. Virgin Islands, since 2010

References

External links

 Official website

Cities and towns in Tuscany